David Leedom Farm, also known as "Pleasant Retreat," is a historic home and farm located at Newtown Township, Bucks County, Pennsylvania. The house was built in four stages, with the oldest dated to the late 18th century and consisting of a one-story, one roof stone structure. A large, 2 1/2-story stone addition was built in the late-18th century. In 1802, a three-story, stone "mansion" section was added.  A two-story, frame addition was built in the early 1800s.  The house features a series of piazzas and the interior of the mansion section has a three-story staircase.  Also on the property are a variety of contributing farm-related buildings.  The house was featured in one of four Newtown farmscape paintings by noted artist Edward Hicks (1780-1849).

It was added to the National Register of Historic Places in 1976.

Gallery

References

Farms on the National Register of Historic Places in Pennsylvania
Federal architecture in Pennsylvania
Houses completed in 1840
Houses in Bucks County, Pennsylvania
National Register of Historic Places in Bucks County, Pennsylvania